The Portfolio Committee on Basic Education is a portfolio committee of the National Assembly in the Parliament of South Africa. The remit of this committee is to oversee the work of the Department of Basic Education, Umalusi and the South African Council of Educators.

Committee membership
Following the May 8, 2019 general election, the committee was established for the 6th Parliament (2019–2024) on 27 June 2019 and Bongiwe Mbinqo-Gigaba of the African National Congress was elected chairperson on 2 July. The membership of the committee is as follows:

The following people serve as alternate members:
Wynand Boshoff MP (Freedom Front Plus)
Bantu Holomisa MP (United Democratic Movement)
Chantel King MP (Democratic Alliance)
Mzwakhe Sibisi MP (National Freedom Party)
Sophie Thembekwayo MP (Economic Freedom Fighters)
Bafuze Yabo MP (African National Congress)

References

Committees of the National Assembly of South Africa